Tkhmori is a village in the Ambrolauri Municipality of Racha-Lechkhumi and Kvemo Svaneti in northern Georgia.

References

Populated places in Ambrolauri Municipality